Aref Mohammadvand born July 11, 1970) is an Iranian retired football player. He played for Malavan and Persepolis F.C.

References 

Iranian footballers
People from Bandar-e Anzali
Persepolis F.C. players
Tarbiat Yazd players
Pas players
Zob Ahan Esfahan F.C. players
Tractor S.C. players
Pegah Gilan players
Malavan players
Living people
1970 births
Association football midfielders
Sportspeople from Gilan province